Thaumatotibia encarpa, the cacao husk borer, is a moth of the family Tortricidae. It is found in south-east Asia, including India, the Chagos Archipelago, Sri Lanka and Malaysia.

The larvae feed on the leaves, fruit and seeds of Citrus, Litchi chinensis, Theobroma cacao and Ziziphus jujuba.

External links
Tortricidae foodplant database

Grapholitini